The Torneo Federal A (in English "Federal A Tournament") is one of the two professional leagues that form the regionalised third level of the Argentine football league system, along with Primera B Metropolitana. The competition was established in 2014 as a result of a change in the structure of the league system, replacing Torneo Argentino A.

Federal A is organised by "Consejo Federal", a division of the Argentine Football Association. Clubs in Federal A have indirect membership in AFA unlike clubs in Primera B, which have direct membership. All teams with indirect membership are from outside the city of Buenos Aires (playing in regional leagues) and its metropolitan area (Greater Buenos Aires), while most of the direct members are from the aforementioned area.

Format (2023 season)

First stage
The 36 teams were split into four zones of nine teams, where they will play against the other teams in their group four: twice at home and twice away. The top four teams from each zone qualified for the final stages.

Final Stages
The final stages was played between the 16 teams that qualified from the first stage. They were seeded in the final stages according to their results in the first stage, with the best eight seeded 1–8, and the worst eight teams seeded 9–16. The teams played four rounds and the winner was declared champion and automatically promoted to the Primera Nacional, the losing team in the final qualified for a promotion playoff against a team from Primera B Metropolitana.

Relegation
After the first stage, the bottom team of each zone were relegated to the Torneo Regional Federal Amateur, giving a total of four teams relegated.

Participating teams (2023 season)

Zone A

Zone B

Zone C

Zone D

List of champions

Titles by club

Seasons in Torneo Federal A
Note: Updated to 2023 season. Teams in bold currently playing in Torneo Federal A.

Top scorers

Top Scorers by Tournament

Notes

References

External links
 
 Ascenso del Interior 
 Interior Futbolero  
 Promiedos

 
2014 establishments in Argentina
3
Association football leagues in South America
Professional sports leagues in Argentina
Sports leagues established in 2014
Argentina

fr:Championnat d'Argentine de football D3